is a railway station in the city of  Namerikawa, Toyama, Japan, operated jointly by the private railway operator Toyama Chiho Railway and the third-sector railway operator Ainokaze Toyama Railway.

Lines

Station layout 
he Ainokaze Toyama Railway portion of the station has one ground-level side platform and one ground-level island platform connected by a footbridge. The station is staffed. The Toyama Chihō Railway portion of the station has a single unnumbered ground-level side platform serving a single bi-directional track.

Platforms

History
Namerikawa Station was opened on 24 March 1906, and was nationalised in 1908, becoming part of the Japanese Government Railways network, and subsequently the Japanese National Railways (JNR). The Toyama Chihō Railway portion of the station opened on 25 June 1913.

From this date, Namerikawa Station was transferred to the ownership of the third-sector operating company Ainokaze Toyama Railway.

Adjacent stations

Passenger statistics
In fiscal 2015, the Ainokaze Toyama Railway portion of the  station was used by an average of 1368 passengers daily (boarding passengers only). The Toyama Chihō Railway portion of the station was used by 319 passengers daily.

Surrounding area 
 Namerikawa City Hall

See also
 List of railway stations in Japan

References

External links

  Ainokaze Toyama Railway
  Toyama Chihō Railway

Railway stations in Toyama Prefecture
Railway stations in Japan opened in 1906
Stations of Toyama Chihō Railway
Stations of Ainokaze Toyama Railway
Namerikawa, Toyama